Daniel Cocke Hatcher (1837 – January 5, 1912) was an American politician who represented Loudoun and Fauquier counties in the Virginia House of Delegates from 1895 to 1899.

References

External links 

1837 births
1912 deaths
Democratic Party members of the Virginia House of Delegates
19th-century American politicians